The Philadelphia Singers was a choir in Philadelphia, in the U.S. state of Pennsylvania. The group was founded by Michael Korn in 1972 and later directed by David Hayes. In 2001, The Philadelphia Singers was named "Resident Chorus of The Philadelphia Orchestra" and was the only chorus to receive this distinction.

The Philadelphia Singers appeared twice at the Lincoln Center Festival with Kurt Masur and the New York Philharmonic, premiering for the first time in the United States works by Krysztof Penderecki and Dov Seltzer. The choir also appeared with The Philadelphia Orchestra, premiering in the United States works by Sir James MacMillan, Luciano Berio, and Augusta Read Thomas as well as world premieres of works by Daniel Kellogg and Jennifer Higdon.

The Philadelphia Singers maintained its own annual subscription series and was the only Philadelphia ensemble to have a regular national radio broadcast on Public Radio International called "Christmas with The Philadelphia Singers". The program was a live broadcast of its annual concert, "Christmas on Logan Square", at St. Clement's Church.  The ensemble was devoted to presenting choral music from all periods with a particular focus on American choral music. The group dissolved after its 2015 season citing rising costs and lack of funding sources.

References

Choirs in Pennsylvania
Musical groups established in 1972